Giovanni Moretti (3 December 1909 – 1 February 1971) was an Italian professional footballer, who played as a forward.

External links 
Profile at MagliaRossonera.it 

1909 births
1971 deaths
A.C. Milan players
Association football forwards
Brescia Calcio players
Italian footballers
People from Crema, Lombardy
Serie A players
Serie B players
Sportspeople from the Province of Cremona
Footballers from Lombardy